Get or GET may refer to:
 Get (animal), the offspring of an animal
 Get (divorce document), in Jewish religious law
 GET (HTTP), a type of HTTP request
 "Get" (song), by the Groggers
 Georgia Time, used in the Republic of Georgia
 Get AS, a Norwegian cable-TV operator and internet service provider
 GET-ligaen, the premier Norwegian ice hockey league
 Gets (people), or Getae, Thracian tribes
 Graded exercise therapy, a therapy for chronic fatigue syndrome
 Groupe des Écoles des Télécommunications, now Institut Mines-Télécom, a French public institution
 Guaranteed Education Tuition Program, in Washington state
 GetTV, an American digital multicast television network
 Get 27, a mint liqueur
 Geraldton Airport, IATA airport code "GET"

See also
 
 
 Git (disambiguation)
 Got (disambiguation)

 Acquisition (disambiguation)
 Receive (disambiguation)
 Possess (disambiguation)